Jaguar XJ220 is a pseudo-3D racing game released by Core Design for the Amiga in 1992 and Mega-CD in 1993. The car featured is the eponymous Jaguar.

Gameplay
The game takes place in a series of championship races across 12 different countries, with three races in each. The player starts in England but must decide which country to race in next, which costs the team various amounts. The player can also choose to repair damage to the car. The game also featured a two player mode similar to the Lotus challenge games.

Track editor
The game features an edit mode that allows players to create their own track.

Reception
Jaguar XJ220 received good reviews. Amiga Action rated the game 98% and praised the intuitive gameplay and the inclusion of a track editor. CU Amiga noted that the quantity of detail that is in the game sets it apart from other racing games. Detail such as options, control using the mouse or joystick, track editor and manual or automatic gears. The magazine also noted the high quality sound, which includes an in-game CD player with a choice of six tracks. The One Amiga rated the game 85% and called it an essential purchase, better than its popular competitor Lotus II. The magazine said that the game was the best arcade-style racing game available.

See also
 Lotus (video game series)

References

External links
 

1992 video games
Amiga games
Core Design games
Jaguar Cars
Racing video games
Sega CD games
Video games developed in the United Kingdom